Spike Team is an Italian animated series created by Andrea Lucchetta, and produced by Rai Fiction, Lucky Dreams and Graphilm. It revolves around a volleyball team of six girls and their coach, Lucky.

The first season aired in Italy from November 2010 to May 2011, while the second season from July 17, 2014; the third one, along with a live-action, is in production.

A special 40-minute-long episode, Il sogno di Brent (Brent's Dream), was presented in September 2012 during the Paralympic Games and opened, on December 3, the European Day of People with Disabilities. It then aired in Italy on December 1, 2013.

Plot 
Madame A, an unscrupulous businesswoman, controls Evertown, a city without green in which sport is no longer practiced. The only land yet to be conquered is the one on which stands the Spikersfield College, but, as it isn't for sale, she attempts to kill the owner Armand Alea. The will of the man, however, states that, in order to take possession not only of the land and the school, but also of the Torch of Olympia, preserved in the museum of the institute, the potential buyers must participate in a volleyball tournament, the Alea Cup. Against Madame A's team, the Black  Roses, there's the Spike Team, formed by Jo, Victoria, Beth, Patty, Susan, and Ann Mary, coached by Lucky, a former volleyball champion. Thanks to the tournament, the six girls not only discover their strengths and weaknesses, but also the special virtues that, represented by six gems, are able to re-ignite the Olympic flame.

Characters

Main characters 
Johanna "Jo" RobertsonCharismatic and bold, she never gives up and doesn't hesitate to help others, but is very proud. Due to the difficult life she had, she thinks that nothing is free and disappointments are always ambush. After the death of her parents Eric and Isabel Arriaga, she grew up in the ghetto of Evertown with her grandmother Rina, her twin brother Julio and the eight-year-old brother Ramon: to help her family she dropped out of college, despite her intention to continue to study, and began working in one of Madame A's beauty farms as a cleaner. In exchange for a scholarship, she agrees to enter the Spike Team, becoming the captain. She has a crush on Carlos and finds her gem, the ruby of Strength, in episode 23.
Victoria "Vicky" SilvestriDisciplined, tidy and obedient, her dream is winning at least once, but without tricks. In college, she sleeps in the same room as Susan and her family belongs to the upper class: her mother Nicole Sanders is a tennis player, and her father James is a former equestrian champion who had to give up the Olympics due to an injury that made him lame. For this reason he wants his daughter to absolutely win horseriding races. She has a special bond with Phil and finds her gem, the turquoise of Loyalty, in episode 12.
Elizabeth "Beth" MonroeShy and sweet, she loves books, poetry and comics. She is a sincere and discreet girl who always tells the truth. She lives with her father Nathan, chief fireman, her mother Gwen, a quiet Irish woman, her older brother Adam, who attends the police academy, and her pet turtle Ruga. She dreams of becoming a writer and is good at playing piano. She is in love with Mark and finds her gem, the emerald of Courage, in episode 21.
Patricia "Patty" Tan DenverA studious girl, she's always up to date with the latest technology and has a strong will. Born in Singapore, her mother Ai Linn Tan died when she was seven years old and Patty has traveled all over the world because his father, Charles Fitzpatrick Denver, is a United Nations diplomat. Never being at home, Mr. Denver has left his daughter in the hands of foster parents who spoiled her with many gifts: so, Patty has never had to work to get something. She initially clashes with Jo, but then changes and shows a strong need to be accepted and have a family. She finds her gem, the amethyst of the spirit of Sacrifice, in episode 5.
Susan BredfordCareless, lazy and a little clumsy, she's always cheerful and positive and her humor is contagious. She likes eating, sleeping, playing video games and watching TV. She lives with her parents Kevin and Laura Carter, and her eight-year-old sister Martha; she also has a maternal grandmother, Emma. She finds her gem, the topaz of Balance, in episode 8.
Ann Mary LewitElegant and snob, she's the youngest daughter of a very important family of Evertown: her father Roger is a rich businessman and her mother Stella Ardakis is a woman of class. She also has two older brothers, Hugh and Steven, who work in her father's companies. A smart girl who loves pink, she is very kind and always sees the best of everyone. She dreams of becoming a fashion designer. She finds her gem, the lapis lazuli of Perseverance, in episode 17.
LuckyA former champion, after giving up volleyball he worked as a gardener at Villa Ruskin, but then his old coach Luther convinces him to return to the world of sport to train the Spike Team. Determined, generous and ironic, he has faith in the values of sport and doesn't tolerate foul play. He's in love with Grace. He is based on Italian former volleyball player Andrea Lucchetta.

Other characters 
Julio RobertsonJo's twin brother, he lives in the ghetto. He dropped school, and likes basketball and motorbikes: his dream is breaking into the world of racing. He has a crush on Ann Mary.
Carlos MonteroIt's a tough boy who lives with his mother, Francisca Gracia. He spends a lot of time in the ghetto with his best friend Julio, and likes skateboards. He works at a car wash to earn money to cure his mother. He has a crush on Jo.
Mark McGowanKind and sophisticated, he lives in uptown Evertown, although he spent most of his life on the boat of his parents, owners of a sail yard. He likes poetry and is very popular among girls.
Philip "Phil" BergerFunny and ironic, he has a perfect pitch for music. He has a crush on Victoria and his sister Nadia lives in Tel Aviv.
Justin ClarkeHe is the leader of a gang of bullies of the Norton College, a school for rich kids, and has a crush on Irina. He has a sister, Kate, who plays in the Black Roses.
Irina SkinnerThe captain of the Black Roses, she's a loyal girl who doesn't like foul play. She starts dating Justin.
Armand AleaThe owner and president of Spikersfield College, he's an archaeologist and researcher of ancient sports memorabilia. He's thrown off a cliff by the men of Madame A, but manages to escape and, with a fake will, announces the volleyball tournament that will decide the fate of the school. He hides in a secret room of the museum, under the hall of the Torch: the only person who knows he's still alive is Luther, and then Grace.
LutherGuardian of the sports facilities of the Spikersfield College, he's Lucky's former coach and manages to convince him to return to the world of sport and train the Spike Team.
Grace LotonProfessor of Archaeology at the Spikersfield College, she was a cheerleader. She is the daughter of Ralph, a mechanic, and Jenny Kowalsky, a teacher. Following Armand Alea's death, she becomes the executor, the new director of the college and the promoter of the tournament.
Vito RevelliHe's the owner of Vito's, a kiosk on the beach, where Lucky often goes along with the Spike Team.
Amalia Grabhall "Madame A"A business woman without scruples, she wants to take possession of the whole Evertown. In order to participate in the tournament, she buys the best women's volleyball team in the market, the Black Roses, and takes an unconventional coach, Max Coachrane. She has a cat named Veleno and is allergic to flowers; she's always looking for ways to stay young and fight belly, baldness and wrinkles.
Max Coachrane "Coach Match"The coach of the Black Roses, he wants to win at any cost.
Pereira
Pinkett
Mimicrì and Linxy

Episodes

First season (2010–2011)

Second season (2014)

Third season

Broadcast 
Spike Team has been acquired by Foothill Entertainment for English-language countries, by Rose Entertainment for South America and by Ypsilon Entertainment for Spain-language countries. On 15 April 2018, the series debuted on Duronto TV in Bangladesh.

Books

References

External links 
  

2010 Italian television series debuts
2010s Italian television series
Italian children's animated television series